Benedict (died 1055) was a Hungarian prelate and politician, who served as Archbishop of Kalocsa from 1035 to 1046 and as Archbishop of Esztergom between 1046 and 1055.

Benedek was present at the martyrdom of Bishop Gerard of Csanád and his fellows, but he survived the incident. His name is appeared in the founding charter of the Tihany Abbey.

Bibliography 

|-

|-

1055 deaths
Archbishops of Esztergom
11th-century Roman Catholic archbishops in Hungary
11th-century Hungarian people
Year of birth unknown